Diana is an unincorporated community in Webster County, West Virginia, United States, along West Virginia Route 15 and the Right Fork of the Holly River.

References 

Unincorporated communities in Webster County, West Virginia
Unincorporated communities in West Virginia
Coal towns in West Virginia